Tasting Menu is a 2013 Spanish-Irish comedy film directed by Roger Gual and starring Stephen Rea.

Cast
Jan Cornet as Marc
Claudia Bassols as Rachel
Vicenta Ndongo as Mar
Fionnula Flanagan as Comptessa
Stephen Rea as Walter
Togo Igawa as Ishao
Andrew Tarbet as Max
Marta Torné as Mina
Akihiko Serikawa as Yoshio
Timothy Gibbs as Daniel
Santi Millán as Presentador
Andrea Ros as Paula
Andrés Herrera as Ramón
Iván Morales as Edu
Marc Rodríguez as Hidalgo
Nancys Rubias as Músics

Release
The film premiered at the Málaga Film Festival in April 2013 and was released in Spain on June 14, 2013.  In April 2013, it was announced that Magnolia Pictures acquired U.S. distribution rights to the film.  The film was released in U.S. theaters on April 18, 2014.

Reception
The film has a 17% rating on Rotten Tomatoes based on 18 reviews.

Susan Wloszczyna of RogerEbert.com awarded the film two stars and wrote, "Yet nothing truly creates any emotional waves, and little seems at stake, no matter what potential disaster might seem to be in the offing."

Justin Chang of Variety gave the film a negative review and wrote, "This relentlessly mediocre ensemble dramedy features several of the least compelling dinner guests in recent memory."

Clayton Dillard of Slant Magazine awarded the film half a star out of four and wrote, "There’s a sinister, even insidious quality to a film that insists upon using incessant food montages not as a source of passion, but fodder for class-based self-congratulation."

Mike D'Angelo of The A.V. Club graded the film a D+ and wrote, "Among other demerits, this is the rare foodie movie that doesn’t seem to care much about food."

Jonathan Holland of The Hollywood Reporter also gave the film a negative review and wrote, "Deliberately insubstantial, sometimes savory, sometimes tasteless and ultimately dissatisfying, Tasting Menu is the filmic equivalent of its title."

References

External links